Katwe Airport  is an airport serving the hamlet of Katwe in Kundelungu National Park, a protected area of Haut-Katanga Province, Democratic Republic of the Congo.

See also

 Transport in the Democratic Republic of the Congo
 List of airports in the Democratic Republic of the Congo

References

External links
 OpenStreetMap - Katwe
 FalllingRain - Katwe
 HERE Maps - Katwe
 OurAirports - Katwe Airport
 

Airports in Haut-Katanga Province